Blitzkrieg: From the Rise of Hitler to the Fall of Dunkirk is a 1979 military history book by Len Deighton. Unlike most of Deighton's other work the book is entirely non-fiction.

Details
The book explains Adolf Hitler's victory in 1940 in the Western Campaign. Deighton points out that Allies had far greater resources than the Germans. Deighton considers Hitler's military skills astonishing considering his background and complete lack of training (p. 52).

Literally meaning "Lightning War", Blitzkrieg is the tactic of speed and the avoidance of unnecessary conflict, which were the keys to the rapid German advance.

The foreword is by general Walter Nehring, formerly Heinz Guderian's chief of staff.

Contents
Part 1: Hitler and his army
Part 2: Hitler at war.
Part 3: Blitzkrieg:Weapons and methods.
Part 4: The battle for the river Meuse.
Part 5: The flawed victory.

Adaptations
  1987 Len Deighton's Blitzkrieg computer game was published by Ariolasoft for the Commodore 64. The game was designed by John Lambshead and Gordon Paterson and programmed by Gary Yorke and James Poole.

References 

1979 non-fiction books
History books about World War II
British non-fiction literature
Books by Len Deighton
20th-century history books
Jonathan Cape books